Robert Otto Ashbach (July 18, 1916 – October 23, 1990) was an American politician, businessman, and farmer.

Biography
Ashbach was born in Waconia, Minnesota and grew up in Roseville, Minnesota. He went to the public schools and to Bethel Academy High School in Saint Paul, Minnesota. He went to University of Minnesota and studied forestry. He worked in construction and was President of the Ashbach Construction Company. Ashbach also was involved in the banking business. Ashbach lived with his wife and family in Arden Hills, Minnesota. He served on the Arden Hills City Council from 1950 and then served as mayor of Arden Hills from 1952 to 1963. Ashbach also served on the school board in 1985 and was a Republican. Ashbach served in the Minnesota House of Representatives from 1963 to 1966 and in the Minnesota Senate from 1967 to 1982. Ashbach died in a hospital in Saint Paul, Minnesota after undergoing open heart surgery.

References

External links

|-

|-

|-

1916 births
1990 deaths
People from Arden Hills, Minnesota
People from Roseville, Minnesota
People from Waconia, Minnesota
Businesspeople from Minnesota
University of Minnesota College of Food, Agricultural and Natural Resource Sciences alumni
School board members in Minnesota
Minnesota city council members
Mayors of places in Minnesota
Republican Party Minnesota state senators
Republican Party members of the Minnesota House of Representatives
20th-century American politicians
20th-century American businesspeople